The Men's omnium competition at the 2021 UCI Track Cycling World Championships was held on 23 October 2021.

Qualifying
The first 12 riders in each heat advance.

Heat 1
The race was started at 10:00.

Heat 2
The race was started at 10:23.

Results

Scratch race
The scratch race was started at 12:24.

Tempo race
The tempo race was started at 12:24.

Elimination race
The elimination race was started at 18:51.

Points race and overall standings
The points race was started at 20:02.

References

Men's omnium